Amantle Montsho (born July 4, 1983) is a female sprinter from Botswana who specializes in the 400 metres. She represented her country at the 2004 and 2008 Summer Olympics, reaching the final at the latter edition. She was the first woman to represent Botswana at the Olympics. She has also competed at the World Championships in Athletics and the IAAF World Indoor Championships, and is the former World Champion over the 400m, winning in a personal best time of 49.56 in Daegu.

Montsho was suspended for two years for an anti-doping rule violation after she tested positive for methylhexaneamine at the 2014 Commonwealth Games.

A two-time African Championships gold medallist over 400 m, she has also won titles in the event at the 2007 All-Africa Games, the 2010 IAAF Continental Cup and the 2010 Commonwealth Games. Her Commonwealth win made her Botswana's first-ever gold medallist of the games.

Her personal best times are 11.60 seconds in the 100m, 22.89 seconds in the 200m, and 49.33 seconds in the 400m. She trains at the High Performance Training Centre in Dakar, Senegal, and She holds the national record for the 400 m both indoors and outdoors.

Career
Montsho was born in Maun, Ngamiland.  She has competed at the 2004 Olympic Games, the 2006 Commonwealth Games and the World Championships in 2005 and 2007 without reaching the finals.

She won the silver medal at the 2006 African Championships and the gold medal at the 2007 All-Africa Games. At the All-Africa Games, she also finished fifth in the 200 metres. At the 2006 IAAF World Cup she finished sixth with the African 4x400 metres relay team. She ran a personal best and Botswana record of 49.83 seconds to win at the 2008 African Championships in Athletics. It remains the Championship record for the event.

She ran at the 2008 IAAF World Indoor Championships but did not reach the final after a poor showing in the semifinal. Montsho reached her first world final at the 2008 Beijing Olympics, but her time of 51.18 left her in the last position. The following year, she ran 49.89 in the semifinals at the 2009 World Championships in Athletics, which was enough to make the final round of the 400 m. She ran slower in the final than in the semis and finished last. She ended the year with a fifth-place finish at the 2009 IAAF World Athletics Final.

The 2010 season brought her a series of major titles: she came close to the podium at the 2010 IAAF World Indoor Championships: having set indoor national records in the heats and semi-finals, she was beaten to the bronze medal by Vania Stambolova. She opened her outdoor season with her third fastest ever 400 m run, winning the Gabriel Tiacoh meet in a time of 50.35 seconds – almost two seconds ahead of her training partner Ndeye Fatou Soumah who was next to finish. She defended her continental title by winning the 400 m at the 2010 African Championships in Athletics with a season's best run of 50.03 seconds.

On the 2010 Diamond League circuit, she won at the Bislett Games and was ranked second overall in the 400 m behind Allyson Felix. Montsho ran her fastest time of the year at the 2010 Continental Cup where, representing Africa, she beat Debbie Dunn to win the gold medal in 49.89 seconds. She extended her season further to compete at the 2010 Commonwealth Games. There she became Botswana's first-ever gold medallist at the Games by winning the 400 m with a Games record time of 50.10 seconds. She then helped the Botswana team to the 4×400 m relay final, but they finished in seventh place.

At the 2011 World Championships in Athletics in South Korea, in the 400 metres final, she narrowly beat Alyson Felix to become Botswana's first World or Olympic track and field champion.

At the 2012 Olympics final she placed 4th with 49.75 seconds.

At the 2013 World Championships in Athletics in Moscow, she was run down in the final metres by Christine Ohuruogu of the 400 metres final, losing by just four-thousandths of a second when Ohuruogu dipped and Montsho remained upright.

She won a gold medal at the 2018 Commonwealth Games in Gold Coast, Queensland, Australia when she and fellow athlete Isaac Makwala made history by being the first athletes from the same country to win both the 400m women and mens in the same Commonwealth Games event.

Doping ban 
At the 2014 Commonwealth Games, Montsho failed a routine drugs test. Subsequently, this finding was confirmed by the results of her 'B' sample which also tested positive for the stimulant methylhexaneamine. In March 2015 Botswana Athletics Association handed her a 2-year ban from sports.

Education 
Amantle Montsho has schooled in Bonatla Primary School in Maun.

International competitions

References

External links
 

1983 births
Living people
People from North-West District (Botswana)
Botswana female sprinters
Olympic female sprinters
Olympic athletes of Botswana
Athletes (track and field) at the 2004 Summer Olympics
Athletes (track and field) at the 2008 Summer Olympics
Athletes (track and field) at the 2012 Summer Olympics
Athletes (track and field) at the 2020 Summer Olympics
Commonwealth Games gold medallists for Botswana
Commonwealth Games medallists in athletics
Athletes (track and field) at the 2006 Commonwealth Games
Athletes (track and field) at the 2010 Commonwealth Games
Athletes (track and field) at the 2014 Commonwealth Games
Athletes (track and field) at the 2018 Commonwealth Games
African Games gold medalists for Botswana
African Games medalists in athletics (track and field)
Athletes (track and field) at the 2003 All-Africa Games
Athletes (track and field) at the 2007 All-Africa Games
Athletes (track and field) at the 2011 All-Africa Games
World Athletics Championships athletes for Botswana
World Athletics Championships medalists
Doping cases in athletics
Botswana sportspeople in doping cases
Athletes (track and field) at the 2019 African Games
Diamond League winners
IAAF Continental Cup winners
Commonwealth Games gold medallists in athletics
World Athletics Championships winners
Medallists at the 2010 Commonwealth Games
Medallists at the 2018 Commonwealth Games